Flavius Fravitta (died 404/405) was a leader of the Goths and a top-ranking officer in the army of the Eastern Roman Empire.

Fravitta was a member of the Visigoth aristocracy. He was also a pagan, and for this reason he was praised by Eunapius, a Greek historian of the 4th–5th centuries.

In 382, the Visigoths had signed a treaty with Roman Emperor Theodosius I, according to which the Visigoths were allowed to live in the Roman territory at the mouth of the Danube, with the rank of foederati, thus providing the Roman army with troops. However, within the Goths there were two parties, which grew more and more hostile to each other. One was formed by the Arian Christian majority, the "Gothic party", led by Eriulf and opposed to the assimilation of the Goths in the Roman culture. Fravitta, on the other side, led those Goths who wanted to stay faithful to the treaty and who wanted to be assimilated. In 391, while Eriulf and Fravitta were both dining with Theodosius, they quarreled, and Fravitta killed Eriulf, and only the intervention of the imperial guards saved him from the vengeful followers of Eriulf; while his support among the Goths decreased, his position at court was strengthened. Later he married a Roman woman of high rank, thus helping his own assimilation into Roman society, as well as his people's.

He was loyal to the Empire for all of his life, and rose through the ranks of the army, until he reached the office of Magister militum, with the task of suppressing the revolts in the East (395).

According to Zosimus, Fravitta was responsible for having "freed the entire East, from Cilicia to Phoenicia and Palestine, from the plague of brigands".

In 400 he led the fleet of the Eastern Roman Emperor Arcadius and decisively defeated the fleet of the rebel Arian Goth Gainas, in Thrace, while they were trying to pass to Asia Minor. As a reward, he asked to be allowed to worship the Pagan gods freely; the Emperor granted him his wish and designated him as consul for 401.

He later fell out of favour because of several intrigues in the Eastern court, as the imperial policy towards the Goths changed because of the rebellion of Gainas. Fravitta was unjustly accused of treachery and put to death.

See also
 Gento (Goth)

Bibliography 
 Wolfram, Herwig, History of the Goths, University of California Press, 1998, pp. 146–147, 149.
 Arnold Hugh Martin Jones, John Martindale, John Morris, Prosopography of the Later Roman Empire, volume 1, Cambridge 1971, p. 372.
 E. W. Brooks, "Le province dell'oriente da Arcadio ad Anastasio", Storia del mondo medievale, volume I, 1999, pp. 445–479
 M. Manitius, "Le migrazioni germaniche 378-412", Storia del mondo medievale, volume I, 1999, pp. 246–274

References 

4th-century births
400s deaths
4th-century Gothic people
4th-century Romans
5th-century Byzantine people
5th-century Visigothic people
5th-century Roman consuls
Gothic warriors
Imperial Roman consuls
Magistri militum
Year of birth unknown
Year of death uncertain
Late-Roman-era pagans